Alice de Oliveira Côrrea (born 2 March 1996) is a Brazilian Paralympic athlete who competes in sprinting events at international elite competitions. She is a Paralympic silver medalist at the 2016 Summer Paralympics.

References

1996 births
Living people
Athletes from Rio de Janeiro (city)
Paralympic athletes of Brazil
Brazilian female sprinters
Athletes (track and field) at the 2012 Summer Paralympics
Athletes (track and field) at the 2016 Summer Paralympics
Medalists at the 2016 Summer Paralympics
21st-century Brazilian women